Country Teachers is a 1993 Chinese drama film directed by He Qun. The film was selected as the Chinese entry for the Best Foreign Language Film at the 66th Academy Awards, but was not accepted as a nominee.

Cast
 Li Baotian as Principal Yu
 Ju Xue as Zhang Yingzi
 Wang Xueqi as Sun Shihai
 Xiu Zongdi as Uncle
 Sun Qian as Deng Youmei
 Ding Jiali as Deng's Wife

See also
 List of submissions to the 66th Academy Awards for Best Foreign Language Film
 List of Chinese submissions for the Academy Award for Best Foreign Language Film

References

External links
 

1993 films
1993 drama films
Chinese drama films
1990s Mandarin-language films